Texola elada, the Elada checkerspot, is a species of butterfly in the brush-footed butterfly family, Nymphalidae. It is found from southern Mexico north to central Texas and central Arizona in the United States.

Adults are on wing from April to October. There are several generations per year.

The larvae feed on Siphonoglossa pilosella in Texas. They have been recorded feeding on various yellow Asteraceae species in Mexico. Adults feed on flower nectar.

Subspecies
Texola elada elada (Mexico)
Texola elada ulrica (Texas)
Texola elada perse (Arizona)

References

External links

Bug Guide
nearctica

Melitaeini
Butterflies described in 1868
Butterflies of North America
Taxa named by William Chapman Hewitson